Maria Xaveria Perucona or Parruccona (Novara, c. 1652 - after 1709 in Galliate) was a nun and composer in 17th Century Italy.

Biography 
She was of aristocratic birth as many of her fellow nun-composers such as Cozzolani and would have received musical training at home. 

She grew up in an aristocratic family that ensured her education in singing, playing instruments and general music. She studied with her uncle, Francesco Beria, and teacher, Antonio Grosso, before she took her vows at age 16 as an Ursuline nun in the Collegio di Sant’Orsola in Galliate, near her hometown of Novara.

In 1675, her only work, Sacri concerti de motetti a una, due, tre, e quattro voce, was published in Milan and dedicated to Anna Cattarina della Cerda who had previously made monetary gifts to Sant’Orsola. Sacri concerti consists of 18 motets for a variety of voices, only one incorporating a liturgical text, titled Regina coeli. Other motets from this publication with non liturgical texts were sung during certain services at the convent. The form of these works was sectional with contrasts in meter, textures, and performers. Jane Bower, editor of “Women Making Music,” holds the opinion that the most expressive use of Peruchona’s solos is found in Quid pavemus sorores, which begins with a melismatic bass solo.

Little is known of Peruchona’s life after 1690 and it is believed that she did not publish beyond Sacri concerti because her religious duties took precedence over her composing.

Works
 Sacri concerti de motetti a una, due, tre, e quattro voci, parte con Violini, e parte senza. Milan, 1675.

References

External links
HOASM: Maria Xavier Perucona
Artemisia Editions Maria Xaveria Perucona
Free scores by Maria Xaviera Peruchona at International Music Score Library Project

Italian classical composers
1650s births
Year of death unknown
People from Novara
17th-century Italian composers
17th-century women composers
Italian women classical composers
17th-century Italian Roman Catholic religious sisters and nuns
Ursulines